This is a list of destroyers of the Regia Marina and Marina Militare, sorted by era and class.

Regia Marina

World War I
 
 

 

 

 
 
 
 
 
 
 
 
 
 
 
 
 
  - reclassified as torpedo boats on 1 October 1929

 - renamed Fratelli Cairoli in 1921

  - built as scout cruisers (esploratori), reclassified as destroyers on 1 July 1921
 

  - ordered as scout cruisers (esploratori) for Rumania, but taken over by Italy on 5 June 1915 while building; two sold 1920 and remaining two reclassified as destroyers on 5 September 1938
 - to Nationalist Spain on 5 January 1939 as Melilla
 - to Nationalist Spain on 5 January 1939 as Ceuta 
 - to Romania on 1 July 1920 as NMS Mărășești
 - to Romania on 1 July 1920 as NMS Mărăști
  - built as scout cruisers (esploratori), reclassified as destroyers on 1 October 1938
 
 

  - reclassified as torpedo boats on 1 October 1929

  - reclassified as torpedo boats on 1 October 1929

World War II

  - reclassified as torpedo boats on 1 October 1938

  - reclassified as torpedo boats on 1 October 1929

  - reclassified as torpedo boats on 1 October 1938

 

 

 

 Turbine/Borea class

 

 Freccia/Dardo class

 

 

 Oriani or Poeti class 

Cancelled ships
  - 20 vessels planned, none completedComandante MargottiniComandante BaroniComandante Borsini Comandante BottiComandante CasanaComandante De CristofaroComandante Dell'AnnoComandante FontantaComandante RutaComandante ToscanoComandante GiobbeComandante GiorgisComandante MoccagattaComandante RodocanacchiComandante CorsiComandante EspositoComandante FiorelliComandante GiannatassioComandante MilanoComandante NovaroCaptured ships
 Premuda - former Yugoslav destroyer Dubrovnik, captured in April 1941
 
Sebenico - former Yugoslav destroyer Beograd, captured in April 1941
Lubiana - former Yugoslav destroyer Ljubljana, captured in April 1941
 
 FR 22 - former French destroyer Panthére, captured in November 1942
 
 FR 21 - former French destroyer Lion, captured in November 1942
 FR 24 - former French destroyer Valmy, captured in November 1942
 
 FR 31 - former French destroyer Trombe, captured in November 1942

Marina Militare

Post-World War II
  - ex  USS Woodworth  - ex  USS Nicholson 
 
 
 
 
 
  - former  destroyers of the US Navy
 - ex USS Walker - ex USS Prichett - ex USS Taylor 
 
 
 
 ; formerly Animoso ; formerly Ardimentoso''

References

See also
 Red Sea Flotilla
 Italian World War II destroyers

Italy
Destroyers
Destroyers